Roald Dahl's The Witches, or simply The Witches, is a 2020 supernatural comedy film directed by Robert Zemeckis and written by Zemeckis, Kenya Barris, and Guillermo del Toro. It is based on the 1983 novel of the same name by Roald Dahl and is the second feature-length adaptation of the novel, after the 1990 film of the same name directed by Nicolas Roeg. The film stars Anne Hathaway, Octavia Spencer, and Stanley Tucci, and is narrated by Chris Rock.

The Witches was released on HBO Max in the United States on October 22, 2020, also having a traditional theatrical release in some markets a week later. The film received mixed reviews from critics, who mostly praising the performances and visuals
but criticized its script, deeming it inferior to Roeg's film despite being more faithful to the book.

The film was removed from HBO Max in August 2022.

Plot 

In 1968, young Charlie Hansen lives with his grandmother Agatha in Demopolis, Alabama after a car accident kills his parents in Chicago. Gradually, Charlie is cheered up by Agatha who buys him a pet mouse whom he names Daisy. One day, Charlie buys a box of nails to train Daisy and to build a house for her as well. He is approached by a witch trying to lure him with a snake and a caramel, but Agatha calls him, and the witch disappears.

After telling Agatha about the encounter, Charlie learns that the witches are in fact real. She says a witch cursed her childhood friend Alice into spending the rest of her life as a chicken. Agatha says that witches never leave once they find a child. Frantically, they decide to stay in a nearby hotel where her cousin Eston is the executive chef. While there, Agatha teaches Charlie how to tell a witch from an ordinary woman: real witches have claws instead of fingernails, which they hide by wearing gloves; are bald, which they hide by wearing wigs that give them rashes; have square feet with no toes, have mouths that can open nearly to their ears, and have a powerful sense of smell aided by extendable nostrils, which they use to sniff out children.

The next day, Charlie takes Daisy and a rope to do some training at a grand hall. During his walk there, he meets a gluttonous but friendly boy named Bruno, who is pulled away by his mother. Charlie visits the grand hall, thinking he will be alone. As he is getting ready to train Daisy, a group of witches led by their all-powerful leader, The Grand High Witch, enters the grand hall. Charlie hides under the stage and overhears the Grand High Witch planning to give the world's children a potion, mixed into confectionery products, that will transform them into mice. The Grand High Witch waits for Bruno to arrive, to whom she earlier gave a Swiss chocolate bar laced with the potion. After Bruno arrives, he turns into a mouse and enters the vent where Charlie and Daisy are hiding. The Grand High Witch discovers Charlie and forcibly transforms him into a mouse with the potion, before they escape.

Fleeing to the hotel room where Charlie and his grandmother are staying, they tell Agatha about the witches' plan and discover that the Grand High Witch is staying in the hotel room below them and that Daisy was once an orphaned young human girl named Mary turned into a mouse by a witch. Charlie, Bruno, and Mary devise a plan to get a bottle of the potion so that Agatha can devise a cure to turn them back into children. The plan to get the potion is successful, but since she is unable to create a cure, they instead decide to put the potion into a broth of pea soup which will be given to the witches during their dinner. All the witches drink the soup except the Grand High Witch, who realizes that she met Agatha before; she was the witch who turned Alice into a chicken. While the mice steal the Grand High Witch's room key, the witches all begin turning into rats, and chaos ensues.

After she and the mice flee to the Grand High Witch's room, Agatha starts to collect all the potions to destroy them. The Grand High Witch finds Agatha, and tries killing her, but the mice intervene and trick the Grand High Witch into swallowing her own potion, transforming her into a rat. As Grand High Witch furiously tries to kill Charlie, Bruno, and Mary, they trap her in an ice bucket and prevent her from escaping. Before they leave the room, Agatha takes the Grand High Witch's trunk full of money and also releases her cat Hades from its cage. As they close the door, Hades attacks and kills The Grand High Witch.

Since his parents can no longer accept him, Bruno joins Mary, Charlie, and Agatha to go home with The Grand High Witch's trunk and become a family. Years later, Charlie and Agatha advise young children to eradicate the witches.

Cast 

 Anne Hathaway as the Grand High Witch, the powerful and evil witch who is the leader of all witches in the world. Hathaway also voices her rat form.
 Octavia Spencer as Agatha Hansen, a healer and Charlie's grandmother who is the long-time old enemy of the Grand High Witch.
 Miranda Sarfo Peprah portrays a young version of Agatha.
 Stanley Tucci as Mr. R. J Stringer III, the hotel manager.
 Jahzir Bruno as Charlie Hansen, a young boy who is turned into a mouse by the Grand High Witch. Bruno also voices his mouse form.
 Chris Rock as the voice of Older Charlie Hansen, the narrator and as an elder mouse who tells the firsthand account of his experience as a child to a group of children.
 Codie-Lei Eastick as Bruno Jenkins, an English boy who is turned into a mouse. Eastick also voices his mouse form.
 Kristin Chenoweth as the voice of Daisy, the boy's pet mouse. It is revealed that she was once a human girl named Mary who ran away from the orphanage and was turned into a mouse by the witches four months prior to the events of the film.
 Charles Edwards as Mr. Jenkins, Bruno's father.
 Morgana Robinson as Mrs. Jenkins, Bruno's mother.
 Josette Simon as Zelda, a witch.
 Eugenia Caruso as Consuella, a witch.
 Ana-Maria Maskell as Esmerelda, a witch.
 Orla O'Rourke as Saoirse, a witch.
 Penny Lisle as Lindsay, a witch.
 Simon Manyonda as Sous-Chef
 Philippe Spall as a Chef
 Brian Bovell as Reginald

Production

Development 
Talks of a new adaptation of Dahl's novel began in December 2008, when Guillermo del Toro expressed interest in making a stop motion film. No further developments on the potential project emerged until 10 years later in June 2018, when Robert Zemeckis was hired to direct and write the script. Del Toro would produce, alongside Zemeckis and Alfonso Cuarón, in addition to having a screenplay credit.

The film takes place in Alabama during the 1960s, instead of the novel's 1980s England and Norway, and the boy protagonist is African-American, instead of Norwegian-British like the boy in the original novel and previous adaptations. Nevertheless, the adaptation was described by Zemeckis as being closer to the original novel than the 1990 adaptation, directed by Nicolas Roeg. Kenya Barris co-wrote the film.

Casting 
In January 2019, Anne Hathaway was cast in the role of Grand High Witch. Octavia Spencer was cast in February, with newcomers Jahzir Bruno and Codie-Lei Eastick also joining. In May, Stanley Tucci and Chris Rock were added. In September 2020 it was revealed that Kristin Chenoweth was cast in the film.

Filming 
Principal photography began on May 8, 2019, with filming locations including Alabama, Georgia, and at Warner Bros. Studios, Leavesden in Hertfordshire, England and Virginia Water Lake in Surrey, England. It was expected to wrap on June 25. On June 19, crew member Darren Langford was stabbed in the neck with a Stanley knife on the Warner Bros. Studios set in Leavesden. On March 18, 2021, crew member Johnny Walker was convicted of wounding with intent.

Marketing 
The film collaborated with a Roblox game named Islands for a limited-time Halloween event. It features a boss battle with the Grand High Witch, the main antagonist of the film.

Music 
In July 2019, Zemeckis's regular collaborator, Alan Silvestri, was revealed to be scoring the film. A soundtrack featuring Silvestri's score released by WaterTower Music on October 23, 2020.

Release 
The Witches was scheduled to be released on October 16, 2020. On October 25, 2019, Warner Bros. moved up the release of the film by a week. However, on June 12, 2020, Warner Bros. announced that they pulled the film off the 2020 schedule due to the COVID-19 pandemic.

The film was digitally released in the United States on October 22, 2020, via HBO Max. In November, Variety reported the film was the ninth-most watched straight-to-streaming title of 2020 up to that point.

In some countries that have no access to HBO Max, the film was released in theaters a week later since its digital release.

Home media
The film was released on DVD and Blu-ray by Warner Bros. Home Entertainment on June 14, 2022.

Reception

Box office 
The film grossed $4.9 million in twelve countries in its first week of release. The weekend of November 20, the film made $1.2 million from 23 countries, for a running total of $15.1 million. By January 4, 2021, the film had a running total of $26 million from 32 countries.

Critical response 
The film was criticized for its writing, and was deemed inferior to Roeg's film. The website's critics consensus reads: "The Witches misses a few spells, but Anne Hathaway's game performance might be enough to bewitch fans of this Roald Dahl tale." According to Metacritic, which sampled 31 critics and calculated a weighted average score of 47 out of 100, the film received "mixed or average reviews".

In his two out of four star review, Richard Roeper of the Chicago Sun-Times praised the special effects and the performances, but found the film to be "far too disturbing for young children and not edgy enough to captivate adults." David Ehrlich of IndieWire gave the film a D+ calling the film "dreadful" and stating, "Zemeckis has made some unsuccessful films over the last 20 years, but The Witches is the most frustrating of them all because it feels like it could've been made by somebody else. Anybody else. Roeg's version may have scarred a generation of kids for life, but at least they remembered it."

Controversy 
Numerous disability advocates, including British Paralympic swimmer Amy Marren, accused the film of perpetuating bias against individuals with ectrodactyly and other limb differences. Lauren Appelbaum, a spokesperson for advocacy group RespectAbility, said the film portrays limb differences as "hideous or something to be afraid of." On November 4, 2020, Warner Bros. issued a statement in which they apologized for offending people with disabilities. They further added that they had worked with "designers and artists to come up with a new interpretation of the cat-like claws that are described in the book. [...] The film is about kindness. [...] It was never the intention for viewers to feel that the fantastical, non-human creatures were meant to represent them." Hathaway also issued an apology over the film's portrayal, saying "I particularly want to say I'm sorry to kids with limb differences... Now that I know better I promise I'll do better."

Accolades

References

External links 
 
 

2020 films
2020 comedy films
2020 fantasy films
2020s fantasy comedy films
American children's fantasy films
American dark fantasy films
American fantasy comedy films
Children's horror films
Demons in film
2020s English-language films
Films about curses
Films about mice and rats
Films about potions
Films about shapeshifting
Films about witchcraft
Film controversies
Films based on children's books
Films based on works by Roald Dahl
Films directed by Robert Zemeckis
Films postponed due to the COVID-19 pandemic
Films produced by Alfonso Cuarón
Films produced by Guillermo del Toro
Films scored by Alan Silvestri
Films set in 1968
Films set in Alabama
Films set in hotels
Films shot at Warner Bros. Studios, Leavesden
Films shot in Alabama
Films shot in Georgia (U.S. state)
Films shot in Hertfordshire
Films with screenplays by Guillermo del Toro
Films with screenplays by Kenya Barris
Films with screenplays by Robert Zemeckis
HBO Max films
ImageMovers films
Mexican fantasy comedy films
English-language Mexican films
Warner Bros. films
Films produced by Robert Zemeckis
2020s American films